Greatest Hits is a compilation album by Bob Seger & the Silver Bullet Band, released in 1994. Certified Diamond by the RIAA, it is Seger's most successful album to date. In December 2009, Billboard and Nielsen SoundScan confirmed that with nearly nine million copies sold. Bob Seger's Greatest Hits was the decade's best-selling catalog album in the United States, even out-selling The Beatles' 1 and Michael Jackson's Number Ones. By September 2011, the album had sold a total of 9,062,000 copies in the United States.

Album art
Californian photographer, Karen Miller, took photos of the band as part of two photoshoots for the album. The most popular pictures out of the first photoshoot were the railroad track scenes taken on the Southern Pacific railroad tracks north of Mojave, California. The single picture of Seger holding his guitar became the cover photo. Another photograph of the entire band on the same tracks was used for the centerfold of the booklet that came with the It's a Mystery CD, released the following year.

Other photos on the album include pictures of Seger's newborn son, Cole. The back cover of Seger's son at a water pump was taken at Seger's home at the time in Miami, Florida. Cole was 17 months old at the time. The inside of the booklet includes photos of Silver Bullet Band members Craig Frost, Chris Campbell, and Alto Reed with their kids as well. Seger's manager, Punch Andrews, was skeptical about the idea of using the band's children as album art at first. However, Seger had seen it done before with other artists and insisted on the photographs being used on the final copy of the CD's insert.

Track listing

Personnel
As listed in liner notes.

Roy Bittan – piano
Michael Boddicker – synthesizer
Chris Campbell – bass guitar
Craig Frost – organ
Bobbye Hall – percussion
Russ Kunkel – drums
Bob Seger – lead vocals
Waddy Wachtel – guitar

Chris Campbell – bass guitar
Charlie Allen Martin – drums
Joe Miquelon – electric guitar
Doug Riley – piano, organ
Bob Seger – lead vocals, acoustic guitar
Rhonda Silver – background vocals
Laurel Ward – background vocals
Sharon Lee Williams – background vocals

Drew Abbott – guitar
Chris Campbell – bass guitar
Charlie Allen Martin – drums
Alto Reed – saxophone
Robyn Robbins – Mellotron
Bob Seger – lead vocals, electric piano

Ginger Blake – background vocals
Chris Campbell – bass guitar
Sam Clayton – percussion
Laura Creamer – background vocals
Linda Dillard – background vocals
Bill Payne – piano, organ, synthesizer
Bob Seger – lead vocals, acoustic guitar
David Teegarden – drums

Chris Campbell – bass guitar
Bill Payne – piano, organ
Bob Seger – lead vocals, guitar
David Teegarden – drums, percussion
Julia Waters, Luther Waters, Maxine Waters, Oren Waters – background vocals

Chris Campbell – bass guitar
Venetta Fields – background vocals
Clydie King – background vocals
Sherlie Matthews – background vocals 
Robyn Robbins – organ
Bob Seger – lead vocals, piano, acoustic guitar
David Teegarden – drums, percussion

Ken Bell – guitar
Stanley Carter – background vocals
James Lavell Easley – background vocals
Roger Hawkins – drums, percussion
David Hood – bass guitar
George Jackson – background vocals
Randy McCormick – piano
Howie McDonald – guitar solo 
Alto Reed – saxophone
Bob Seger – lead vocals

Barry Beckett – keyboards
Pete Carr – lead guitar
Venetta Fields – background vocals
Roger Hawkins – drums, percussion
David Hood – bass guitar
Jimmy Johnson – rhythm guitar
Clydie King – background vocals
Sherlie Matthews – background vocals
Bob Seger – lead vocals
Strings conducted and arranged by Jim Ed Norman.

Drew Abbott – electric guitar
Chris Campbell – bass guitar
Glenn Frey – background vocals
Paul Harris – piano, organ
Bob Seger – lead vocals, background vocals, acoustic guitar
David Teegarden – drums

Barry Beckett – keyboards
Pete Carr – lead guitar, acoustic guitar
Roger Hawkins – drums, percussion
David Hood – bass guitar
Jimmy Johnson – rhythm guitar
Bob Seger – lead vocals

Roy Bittan – piano
Bob Glaub – bass guitar
Russ Kunkel – drums
Steve Lukather – acoustic guitar
Bob Seger – lead vocals
Jai Winding – organ

Dawayne Bailey – acoustic guitar
Chris Campbell – bass guitar
Craig Frost – organ
Douglas Kibble – background vocals
Russ Kunkel – drums
Bill Payne – piano 
Bob Seger – lead vocals 
Rick Vito – slide guitar
The Weather Girls (Izora Armstead and Martha Wash) – background vocals

Chris Campbell – bass guitar
Craig Frost – piano  
Alto Reed – saxophone
Jimmy Romeo – saxophone
Bob Seger – vocals, guitar
Crystal Taliefero – saxophone
Tomo Thomas – saxophone
David Teegarden – drums

Rosemary Butler – background vocals
Chris Campbell – bass guitar
Laura Creamer – background vocals
Donny Gerrard – background vocals
Russ Kunkel – drums, percussion
Tim Mitchell – electric guitar
Shaun Murphy – background vocals
Alto Reed – saxophone
Bob Seger – lead vocals, acoustic guitar, piano, synthesizer

Charts

Weekly charts

Year-end charts

Certifications

References

1994 greatest hits albums
Bob Seger compilation albums
Capitol Records compilation albums